Process of a New Decline is the third full-length album by technical death metal band Gorod and the first to feature new drummer Samuel Santiago.

Track listing

Credits 
Guillaume Martinot - Vocals 
Arnaud Pontaco - Guitar
Mathieu Pascal - Guitar
Benoit Claus - Bass
Samuel Santiago - Drums

Release history

References 

2009 albums
Willowtip Records albums
Listenable Records albums
Gorod (band) albums